Clay County School District is a school district serving Clay County, Florida and headquartered in Green Cove Springs.  The School District encompasses a 601 square-mile suburban/rural county in Northeast Florida, including the communities of Orange Park, Middleburg, Green Cove Springs, Fleming Island, Penney Farms, Clay Hill, Oakleaf, and Keystone Heights.

On February 26, 2019, the Clay County School Board voted to move forward with its decision to form a school district police department. Superintendent Addison Davis announced he had hired Lt. Kenneth Wagner, a 20-year veteran with the Clay County Sheriff's Office, as a director and proposed chief for the new department.

Schools

 David Broskie is the Superintendent of Schools for Clay County Public Schools in Florida. He was appointed Interim Superintendent in March 2020 and was elected to a full term as Superintendent in November 2020.

Elementary schools 

 Argyle Elementary School
 Charles E. Bennett Elementary
 Clay Hill Elementary
 Coppergate Elementary
 Discovery Oaks Elementary
 Doctors Inlet Elementary
 Fleming Island Elementary
 Grove Park Elementary
 Keystone Heights Elementary
 Lake Asbury Elementary
 Lakeside Elementary
 McRae Elementary
 Middleburg Elementary
 Montclair Elementary
 Oakleaf Village Elementary
 Orange Park Elementary
 Paterson Elementary
 Plantation Oaks Elementary
 RideOut Elementary
 Ridgeview Elementary
 S. Bryan Jennings Elementary
 Shadowlawn Elementary
 Swimming Pen Creek Elementary
 Thunderbolt Elementary
 Tynes Elementary
 W.E. Cherry Elementary
 Wilkinson Elementary

Middle schools 

 Green Cove Springs Junior High
 Lake Asbury Junior High
 Lakeside Junior High
 Oakleaf Junior High
 Orange Park Junior High
 Wilkinson Junior High

Senior high schools 

 Clay High School
 Bannerman Learning Center
 Orange Park High School
 Keystone Heights Junior/Senior High School
 Middleburg High School
 Ridgeview High School
 Fleming Island High School
 Oakleaf High School

References

External links
 

Education in Clay County, Florida
School districts in Florida